Manchester Public Library may refer to:

In the United Kingdom:
Manchester Central Library, in Manchester, England

In the United States:
Manchester Public Library, a branch of the Pine Mountain Regional Library System in Georgia
North Manchester Public Library, in Wabash County, Indiana
Manchester City Library, in Manchester, New Hampshire